The 2014 Rose of Tralee was the 55th edition of the annual Irish international festival held on 15–19 August 2014. The international finals of the competition were broadcast live by RTÉ One television on 18–19 August.

The Philadelphia Rose, Maria Walsh, was crowned the winner of the competition on 19 August. She was a 27-year-old native of Boston in the United States who moved to Shrule, County Mayo in Ireland in 1994. After her college education, she emigrated to New York City in the United States then moved to Philadelphia in 2011.
	
She had been the favourite with the bookies, with Paddy Power offering odds of 2/5 for her to take victory.

Walsh revealed that she was a lesbian five days after her coronation.

References

External links
Official Site
Official 2014 Rose of Tralee Programme

Rose of Tralee
Rose of Tralee
Rose of Tralee
Rose of Tralee